Bonk on the Head is a novel written by John-James Ford. Published in 2005 by Nightwood Editions, it is about coming of age in a journey that takes the protagonist through the final years of high school, a reserve regiment and the Royal Military College of Canada. The novel was the subject of reviews in The Globe and Mail and the Calgary Herald.

Bonk on the Head tied with The Sundog Season by John Geddes in winning the 2006 Ottawa Book Award in the English fiction category.

References

2005 Canadian novels
Royal Military College of Canada
Novels set in Ontario